The 2023 European Figure Skating Championships were held from 25 to 29 January 2023 in Espoo, Finland. Medals were awarded in the disciplines of men's singles, women's singles, pairs, and ice dance. The competition determined the entry quotas for each federation at the 2024 European Championships.

Finland previously hosted the competition in 1977, 1993 and 2009.

Qualification

Age and minimum TES requirements
The competition is open to skaters from all European member nations of the International Skating Union. The corresponding competition for non-European skaters is the 2023 Four Continents Championships.

Skaters will be eligible for the 2023 European Championships if they turned 15 years of age before 1 July 2022 and met the minimum technical elements score requirements. The ISU accepted scores if they were obtained at senior-level ISU-recognized international competitions during the ongoing season at least 21 days before the first official practice day of the championships or during the preceding season.

Number of entries per discipline 
Based on the results of the 2022 European Championships, each European ISU member nations can field one to three entries per discipline. However, on 1 March 2022, in accordance with a recommendation by the International Olympic Committee (IOC), the International Skating Union (ISU) banned figure skaters and officials from Russia and Belarus from attending all international competitions due to the 2022 Russian invasion of Ukraine.

Schedule

Entries
Member nations began announcing their selections in December 2022. The International Skating Union published a complete list of entries on 3 January 2023.

Changes to preliminary assignments

Medal summary

Medalists
Medals awarded to the skaters who achieve the highest overall placements in each discipline:

Small medals awarded to the skaters who achieve the highest short program or rhythm dance placements in each discipline:

Small medals awarded to the skaters who achieve the highest free skating or free dance placements in each discipline:

Medals by country
Table of medals for overall placement:

Table of small medals for placement in the short/rhythm segment:

Table of small medals for placement in the free segment:

Results

Men

Women

Pairs

Ice dance

References

External links 
 European Championships at the International Skating Union
 

European Figure Skating Championships
European Figure Skating Championships
International figure skating competitions hosted by Finland
European Figure
European Figure Skating Championships
Sports competitions in Finland